"Career Opportunities" is a song by The Clash, recorded for their debut studio album, The Clash in 1977.

Background
The song attacks the political and economic situation in England at the time, citing the lack of jobs available, particularly to youth, and the dreariness and lack of appeal of those that were available. They specifically mention service in the  police forces in addition to jobs that are often perceived as being 'menial' such as a bus driver or ticket inspector, as well as "making tea at the BBC". The song also mentioned service in the military with "I don't wanna go fighting in the tropical heat." Later, the band would change the lyrics during concerts, replacing "tropical heat" with "Falklands Street." This version of lyrics can be heard on Live at Shea Stadium.

The line "I won't open letter bombs for you" is a reference to a former job of Clash guitarist Mick Jones, opening letters for a British government department to make sure they weren't rigged with mailbombs. The song was named by bassist Paul Simonon.

Sandinista! version

The song was re-recorded as one of the last songs on the album Sandinista!, with vocal tracks by the very young Luke and Ben Gallagher (keyboardist Mickey Gallagher's sons) over a simple keyboard melody.

Personnel
 Joe Strummer - lead vocals, rhythm guitar
 Mick Jones - lead guitar, backing vocals
 Paul Simonon - bass, backing vocals
 Terry Chimes - drums, percussion

1977 songs
The Clash songs
Songs written by Mick Jones (The Clash)
Songs written by Joe Strummer
Songs against capitalism
Songs about labor